George Minor (December 7, 1845, Richmond, Virginia - January 30, 1904, Richmond, Virginia) was an American composer. Minor attended a military academy in Richmond, and served during the American Civil War as Chief of Ordnance and Hydrography of the Confederate States Navy. After the war, he went into the music field, teaching at singing schools and conducting at musical conventions. He helped found the Hume-Minor Company, which made pianos and organs. A member of the First Baptist Church of Richmond, Minor was the Sunday school superintendent there.

Works
His works include:
 Golden Light No. 1, 1879
 Golden Light No. 2
 Golden Light No. 3, 1884
 Standard Songs, 1896
 The Rosebud

Music:

 Bringing In the Sheaves

References

American male composers
American composers
Confederate States Navy officers
1845 births
1904 deaths
19th-century American male musicians